Cherry Kathleen Healey (born 1980 as Cherry Kathleen Chadwyck-Healey) is a British television presenter, frequently featuring in self-titled lifestyle documentaries on the BBC.

Early life
Healey is the daughter of Nicholas Gerald Chadwyck-Healey (son of Sir Charles Arthur Chadwyck-Healey, 4th Baronet) and Alison Jill, daughter of Dr N. Stevens, of Morris House, Thaxted, Essex. She has three brothers. She attended Cheltenham Ladies' College until 1999.

Career
Best known for her work with light-hearted documentaries on BBC Three, including studies on drinking, childbirth, body issues, dating, and money, Healey frequently relates documentaries to her own life both during the programmes and on her blog on the BBC website. She presented a mini-series called Britain's Favourite Supermarket Foods on BBC One.

From 2015 until 2019, Healey presented the E4 spin-off The Jump: On the Piste.

In 2018, Healey was a co-founder of The Hotbed Collective podcast, along with writer Anniki Sommerville and journalist Lisa Williams.

Healey has also written for several publications including Grazia, You Me Baby magazine, and Cellardoor online.

She has co-presented four series of Inside the Factory for BBC Two alongside Gregg Wallace. In 2016, Healey took part in Celebrity MasterChef on BBC One. In 2017–2018 her BBC series Find My First Love is being syndicated in the US on FYI.

Personal life
In Summer 2010, Healey married her long-term partner Roly Allen. They have a daughter, born 2009, and a son, born 2013. The couple later separated and divorced.

Television work

References

Living people
1980 births
Alumni of the Royal Central School of Speech and Drama
BBC television presenters
British television presenters
People educated at Cheltenham Ladies' College
Place of birth missing (living people)
Chadwyck-Healey family